Charles Edward "Goggy" Meara was a Major League Baseball outfielder. He was born on April 13, 1891, in New York, New York. He attended college at Manhattan College. Meara played 1 season in 1914 with the New York Yankees and played 4 games. He had 2 hits in 7 at-bats.

Meara died on February 8, 1962, in the Bronx, New York.

External links
Baseball-Reference

New York Yankees players
1891 births
1962 deaths
Manhattan Jaspers baseball players
Perth Amboy Pacers players
Troy Trojans (minor league) players
Burials at Long Island National Cemetery